Terres-de-Haute-Charente is a commune in the department of Charente, southwestern France. It was established on 1 January 2019 by merger of the former communes of Roumazières-Loubert (the seat), Genouillac, Mazières, La Péruse and Suris.

Population

See also 
Communes of the Charente department

References 

Communes of Charente

Communes nouvelles of Charente
Populated places established in 2019
2019 establishments in France